In algebra, a normal homomorphism is a ring homomorphism  that is flat and is such that for every field extension L of the residue field  of any prime ideal ,  is a normal ring.

References 
 

Ring theory
Morphisms